RMN may refer to:

 R.M.N., a 2022 film set in Romania
 Radio Mindanao Network
 Reconciling Ministries Network, a Christian organisation
 Registered Mental Nurse, a nursing credential in the UK
 Réunion des Musées Nationaux, a French cultural umbrella organisation
 Richard Milhous Nixon (1913–1994), 37th president of the United States
 Robotic Magnetic Navigation
 Royal Malaysian Navy
 IATA code for Stafford Regional Airport